NDAC may refer to:

 The U.S. National Defense Advisory Commission of the Office for Emergency Management, set up during the administration of President Franklin D. Roosevelt
 National Diving and Activity Centre, England
 North Dakota Agricultural College, now known as North Dakota State University
 Neodymium acetate, a compound where Nd is neodymium and Ac is a trivial symbol for acetate.